"Better Be Good to Me" is a song written by Mike Chapman, Holly Knight, and Nicky Chinn, recorded by Tina Turner for her solo record Private Dancer (1984) and released as a single in September 1984. The song was originally recorded and released in 1981 by Spider, a band from New York City that featured co-writer Knight as a member. Turner's version was successful in the United States and peaked at No. 5 on the Billboard Hot 100 and No. 6 on the then-Hot Black Singles charts. At the 27th Annual Grammy Awards in 1985, it won Best Rock Vocal Performance, Female, one of four Grammys awarded to Turner's Private Dancer album at that ceremony.

Music video
In the video, Turner is seen performing the song on stage, wearing a black leather jacket and black skin-tight, knee-length leather pants, with leopard print high heels and spikey blond hair. Towards the end, a man (Cy Curnin of the Fixx) appears on stage and grabs Turner's arms. She looks him in the eyes and sings the words, "Why can't you be good to me?", then pushes the man away. At the end of the video, Turner disappears under the stage in a puff of smoke. Both Curnin and the guitarist in the video, Jamie West-Oram (also of the Fixx), perform on the Private Dancer album.

Personnel
Tina Turner – lead vocals, background vocals
Rupert Hine – bass guitar, keyboards, percussion, programming, background vocals
Jamie West-Oram – guitar
Trevor Morais – drums
Cy Curnin – background vocals

Versions and remixes
7-inch edit – 3:43
Video edit – 4:05
Album version – 5:10
Extended 12-inch Remix – 7:47
Extended 12-inch Remix (early fade on Private Dancer EMI Centenary Remaster) – 7:03

Charts and certifications

Weekly charts

Year-end charts

Certifications and sales

References

1984 singles
Tina Turner songs
Songs written by Nicky Chinn
Songs written by Mike Chapman
Songs written by Holly Knight
1981 songs
Grammy Award for Best Female Rock Vocal Performance
Capitol Records singles
Song recordings produced by Rupert Hine
Dance-rock songs